The New York Central Railroad (NYCRR) was formed on December 22, 1914, as a consolidation of the companies listed below. It later merged with the Pennsylvania Railroad to form Penn Central.

The NYCRR owned stock in the New York, Chicago and St. Louis Railroad and the Lake Erie and Western Railroad, but sold it in July 1917 and April 1922, respectively.

Adirondack and St. Lawrence Railroad
Also known as the Mohawk and Malone Railway, the Adirondack and St. Lawrence Railroad was built by Dr. William Seward Webb. The line crossed the northern Adirondacks at Tupper Lake Junction, just north of Tupper Lake. Webb began by purchasing the narrow gauge Herkimer, Newport and Poland Railroad, which ran 16 miles from Herkimer to Poland.  He then had track built from Tupper Lake to Moira and thence to Montreal.  This was variously called the Adirondack and St. Lawrence Railroad and the Mohawk and Malone Railway.  It opened in 1892 from Malone Junction to Childwold Station with a branch from Lake Clear Junction to Saranac Lake.  After 1893, it was controlled by the New York Central and Hudson River Railroad, and in 1913, it merged with the Central as the "Adirondack Division".

Air Line Railway of Michigan

Allegheny and Western Railway

Amsterdam, Chuctanunda and Northern Railroad

Aurora and Cincinnati

Bailey Run, Sugar Creek and Athens Railway

Beech Creek Extension Railroad
 Canoe Creek Railroad
 Clearfield Southern Railroad

Bowman's Creek Railroad

Chicago, Indiana and Southern Railroad (original)

Cleveland, Cincinnati, Chicago and St. Louis Railway
 Cairo, Vincennes and Chicago Railway
 Cairo and Vincennes Railroad
 Central Railroad of Indianapolis
 Central Union Depot and Railway Company of Cincinnati
 Chicago, Indianapolis and St. Louis Short Line Railway
 Cincinnati and Michigan Railroad
 Cincinnati and Southern Ohio River Railway
 Cincinnati and Springfield Railway
 Cincinnati Northern Railroad
 Cincinnati, Jackson and Mackinaw Railway
 Cincinnati, Van Wert and Michigan Railroad
 Celina, Van Wert and State Line 
 Columbus and Northwestern Railway
 Michigan and Ohio Railroad
 Allegan and Southeastern Railroad
 Cincinnati, Hamilton, Middletown and Toledo
 Cincinnati, Indianapolis, St. Louis and Chicago Railway
 Cincinnati, Sandusky and Cleveland Railroad
 Cincinnati, Dayton and Eastern Railroad
 Cincinnati, Wabash and Michigan Railway
 Cincinnati, Wabash and Michigan Railroad
 Cleveland, Columbus, Cincinnati and Indianapolis Railway
 Bellefontaine Railway
 Bellefontaine and Indiana Railroad
 Cleveland, Columbus and Cincinnati Railroad
 Cleveland, Columbus and Cincinnati Railway
 Cleveland, Indianapolis, St. Louis and Chicago Railway
 Columbus, Hope and Greensburg Railroad
 Columbus, Indianapolis and Western
 Columbus, Springfield and Cincinnati Railroad
 Mount Gilead Short Line Railway
 Mount Gilead Short Line Railroad
 Peoria and Eastern Railway
 Indianapolis Union Railway
 Indianapolis Belt Railroad and Stock Yards
 Indianapolis Belt Railroad
 Union Railroad Transfer and Stock Yards
 Indianapolis Belt Railway

Cleveland Short Line Railway (merged 1915)

Cleveland Union Terminals Company

Cornwall Bridge Company (merged 1917)

Detroit and Chicago Railroad (original)

Detroit, Monroe and Toledo Railroad (original)
Chartered in 1855, the Detroit, Monroe and Toledo Railroad (DM&T) ran from Detroit, Michigan, south-southwest along the shore of Lake Erie to Monroe, Michigan. It crossed the state line into Ohio, where it ran into Toledo, Ohio. The line was completed on December 25, 1856. The DM&T leased itself in perpetuity to the Michigan Southern and Northern Indiana Railroad (MS&NI) on July 1, 1856. The MS&NI merged with the Lake Shore Railway in 1869 to form the Lake Shore and Michigan Southern Railway (LS&MS).  The New York Central and Hudson River Railroad achieved a controlling interest in the LS&MS in 1877, and the two companies merged in 1914 to form the New York Central Railroad.  The DM&T's assets were merged into the NYC on January 1, 1915.

Dolgeville and Salisbury Railway (merged 1917)

Dunkirk, Allegheny Valley and Pittsburgh Railroad (original)
 Conewango Valley Railroad
 Dunkirk, Warren and Pittsburgh Railway
 Dunkirk, Warren and Pittsburgh Railroad

Elkhart and Western Railroad (merged 1915)

Fulton Chain Railway (merged 1916)

Geneva, Corning and Southern Railroad (original)

Jamestown, Franklin and Clearfield Railroad (merged 1915)

Kalamazoo and White Pigeon Railroad (original)

Lake Shore and Michigan Southern Railway (original)
 Amboy, Lansing and Traverse Bay Railroad
 Buffalo and Erie Railroad
 Buffalo and State Line Railroad
 Buffalo and Mississippi Railroad
 Battle Creek and Sturgis Railway
 Cleveland and Toledo Railroad
 Cleveland Short Line Railway
 Jamestown, Franklin and Clearfield Railroad
 Central Trunk Railway
 Jamestown and Franklin Railroad
 Junction Railroad
 Connection Railroad
 Lake Shore Railway
 Cleveland, Painesville and Ashtabula Railroad
 Cleveland and Erie Railroad

Michigan Central Railroad
 Bay City and Battle Creek Railway
 Bay City and Battle Creek Railroad
 Battle Creek and Bay City Railway
 Buchanan and St. Joseph River Railroad
 Canada Junction 
 Canada Southern Railway
 Central Railroad of Michigan
 Chicago, Kalamazoo and Saginaw Railway
 Detroit River Tunnel Company
 Canada and Michigan Bridge and Tunnel Company
 Canada and Michigan Tunnel Company
 Michigan and Canada Bridge and Tunnel Company
 Jackson, Lansing and Saginaw Railroad
 Amboy, Lansing and Traverse Bay Railroad
 Kalamazoo and South Haven Railroad

New York Central and Hudson River Railroad (original)

Beech Creek Railroad
 Beech Creek, Clearfield and Southwestern Railroad
 Susquehanna and Southwestern Railroad
 Cambria County Railroad

Boston and Albany Railroad
 Albany and West Stockbridge Railroad
 Castleton and West Stockbridge Railroad
 Boston and Worcester Railroad
 Chester and Becket Railroad
 Grand Junction Railroad and Depot Company
 Chelsea Branch Railroad
 Hudson and Boston Railroad
 Hudson and Berkshire Railroad
 North Brookfield Railroad
 Pittsfield and North Adams Railroad
 Providence, Webster and Springfield Railroad
 Spencer Railroad
 Springfield and North-eastern Railroad
 Springfield, Athol and North-eastern Railroad
 Athol and Enfield Railroad
 Ware River Railroad
 Western Railroad

Buffalo and Lockport Railway
 Buffalo, Kenmore and Tonawanda Electric Railroad

Buffalo and Niagara Falls Railroad
 Buffalo and Black Rock Railroad

Buffalo and Rochester Railroad
 Attica and Buffalo Railroad
 Tonawanda Railroad

Buffalo Erie Basin Railroad

Cape Vincent Railway
Construction was completed to Cape Vincent in April 1852. The railroad from limerick to Cape Vincent was abandoned
84 years later, and all rails were removed in the summer of 1967.

Carbon and Otter Creek Valley Railroad

Carthage and Adirondack Railway
 Black River and St. Lawrence Railway

Carthage, Watertown and Sackets Harbor Railroad

Geneva and Lyons Railroad

Hudson River Railroad
 Troy and Greenbush Railroad
 Troy Union Railroad

Junction Railroad

Mahopac Falls Railroad

Mohawk and Malone Railway
 Adirondack and St. Lawrence Railway
 Herkimer, Newport and Poland Railway
 Mohawk Valley and Northern Railway
 Herkimer, Newport and Poland Railway
 Herkimer, Newport and Poland Extension Railway
 Mohawk and Adirondack Railroad
 Herkimer, Newport and Poland Narrow Gauge Railway

New Jersey Junction Railroad (leased 7–1–1886)
 Jersey City and Bayonne Railroad (stock)
 New Jersey Shore Line Railroad (stock, absorbed 10–24–1914)
 New York and Fort Lee Railroad (leased, absorbed into NYC&HR 1886)
 Hoboken and Hudson River Turnpike
 New York and Bull's Ferry Railroad
 State Line and Stony Point Railroad (stock)

New York and Harlem Railroad (leased 4–1–1873)
 Fourth Avenue Street Railway (bought 1–31–1920)
 New York and Mahopac Railroad
 Port Morris Branch (c. 1842)

New York and Putnam Railroad
 New York and Northern Railway
 New York City and Northern Railroad
 West Side and Yonkers Railway
 Yonkers Rapid Transit Railway

New York Central Railroad
 Albany and Schenectady Railroad
 Mohawk and Hudson Railroad
 Cairo and Lake Huron 
 Canandaigua and Niagara Falls Railroad
 Catskill Railroad
 Columbus Northwestern Railway
 Saratoga and Hudson River Railroad
 Ulster and Delaware Railroad
 Utica and Schenectady Railroad

New York Central Niagara River Railroad

Niagara Bridge and Canandaigua Railroad
 Canandaigua and Niagara Falls Railroad

Spuyten Duyvil and Port Morris Railroad
 Spuyten Duyvil and Port Morris Railroad

Syracuse Junction Railroad

West Shore Railroad (leased 12-5-1885)
 Athens Branch
 Buffalo Lehigh
 New York, West Shore and Buffalo Railway (changed name 12–5–1885)
 North River Railroad
 Jersey City and Albany Railway
 Jersey City and Albany Railroad
 North River Railway
 Syracuse, Ontario and New York Railway (absorbed 6–30–1891)
 West Shore and Ontario Terminal Company (absorbed 7–9–1901)

Northern Central Michigan Railroad (original)

Racquette Lake Railway (merged 1916)

Sturgis, Goshen and St. Louis Railway (merged 1915)

Swan Creek Railway of Toledo (original)

Terminal Railway of Buffalo (original)

Toledo and Ohio Central Railway
 Atlantic and Lake Erie Railroad
 Atlantic and Northwestern Railroad
 Ohio Central Railroad
 Columbus and Sunday Creek Valley Railroad
 Ohio Central Railway
 Zanesville and Western Railroad

Ulster and Delaware Railroad (merged 1932)
 Rondout and Oswego Railroad
 New York, Kingston and Syracuse Railroad
 Hobart Branch Railroad (absorbed 1884)
 Delaware and Otsego Railroad (absorbed 1887)
 Stony Clove and Catskill Mountain Railroad (absorbed 1892)
 Kaaterskill Railroad (absorbed 1892)

References

External links
 NYCRR family tree (PDF)
 NYCRR family tree

 
United States railway-related lists
New York (state) transportation-related lists
New York Central